Eriogonum umbellatum is a species of wild buckwheat known by the common name sulphurflower buckwheat, or simply sulphur flower. It is native to western North America from California to Colorado to central Canada, where it is abundant and found in many habitats, including the sagebrush steppe and alpine areas. It is an extremely variable plant and hard to identify because individuals can look very different from one another. Also, there are many varieties. It may be a perennial herb blooming by summer with stems 10 centimeters tall and two to six clusters of flowers, with a whorl of leaves below the stems, or a sprawling shrub approaching two meters high and wide. The leaves are usually woolly and low on the plant, and the flowers come in many colors from white to bright yellow to purple. Native American groups utilized parts of this plant for a number of medicinal uses.

It is a popular larval host, feeding the bramble hairstreak, desert green hairstreak, lupine blue, Mormon metalmark, Rocky Mountain dotted blue, Sheridan's hairstreak, Sonoran metalmark, and western green hairstreak. Additionally, goats and domestic sheep feed on the plant.

Varieties of this species include, but are not limited to:
E. u. var. argus - often nearly hairless leaves and bright yellow flowers; limited to the Klamath Mountains
E. u. var. dichrocephalum - found throughout much of the western United States
E. u. var. furcosum - a low shrub native to the Sierra Nevada
E. u. var. glaberrimum - (green buckwheat) - a nearly hairless, white-flowered species
E. u. var. humistratum - (Mt. Eddy buckwheat) - a rare northern California endemic
E. u. var. juniporinum - (juniper buckwheat) - an uncommon plant of eastern California and western Nevada
E. u. var. subalpinum - (sulfur buckwheat) - similar to Eriogonum eriogonum but has wider and more spoon-shaped leaves
E. u. var. torreyanum - (Donner Pass buckwheat) - known from fewer than 10 occurrences near the Donner Pass
E. u. var. versicolor - bears pinkish-brown flowers with bright stripes

References

External links

Jepson Manual Treatment
Ethnobotany
Photo gallery

umbellatum
Flora of the Northwestern United States
Flora of California
Flora of the Southwestern United States
Flora of Western Canada
Flora of New Mexico
Flora of the Cascade Range
Flora of the Rocky Mountains
Flora of the Sierra Nevada (United States)
Flora of the California desert regions
Natural history of the California chaparral and woodlands
Natural history of the California Coast Ranges
Natural history of the Mojave Desert
Natural history of the Peninsular Ranges
Natural history of the San Francisco Bay Area
Natural history of the Transverse Ranges
Flora without expected TNC conservation status